Donald Eugene Gibson (April 3, 1928 – November 17, 2003) was an American songwriter and country musician. A Country Music Hall of Fame inductee, Gibson wrote such country standards as "Sweet Dreams" and "I Can't Stop Loving You", and enjoyed a string of country hits ("Oh Lonesome Me") from 1957 into the mid-1970s.

Gibson was nicknamed "The Sad Poet" because he frequently wrote songs that told of loneliness and lost love.

Early days

Don Gibson was born in Shelby, North Carolina, United States, into a poor working-class family.  He dropped out of school in the second grade.

Career
His first band was called Sons of the Soil, with whom he made his first recording for Mercury Records in 1949. In 1957, he journeyed to Nashville to work with producer Chet Atkins and record his self-penned songs "Oh Lonesome Me" and "I Can't Stop Loving You" for RCA Victor. The afternoon session resulted in a double-sided hit on both the country and pop charts. "Oh Lonesome Me" set the pattern for a long series of other RCA hits. "Blue Blue Day", recorded prior to "Oh, Lonesome Me" was a number 1 hit in 1958. Later singles included "Look Who's Blue" (1958), "Don't Tell Me Your Troubles" (1959), "Sea of Heartbreak" (1961); "Lonesome No. 1", "I Can Mend Your Broken Heart" (1962), and "Woman (Sensuous Woman)", a number one country hit in 1972.

Gibson recorded a series of successful duets with Dottie West in the late 1960s and early 1970s, the most successful of which were the Number two country hit "Rings of Gold" (1969) and the top 10 hit "There's a Story Goin' Round" (1970). West and Gibson released an album together in 1969, titled Dottie and Don. He also recorded several duets with Sue Thompson, among these being the Top 40 hits, "I Think They Call It Love" (1972), "Good Old Fashioned Country Love" (1974) and "Oh, How Love Changes" (1975).

His song "I Can't Stop Loving You", has been recorded by over 700 artists, most notably by Ray Charles in 1962. He also wrote and recorded "Sweet Dreams", a song that would become a major 1963 crossover hit for Patsy Cline.  Roy Orbison was a fan of Gibson's songwriting, and in 1967, he recorded an album of his songs simply titled Roy Orbison Sings Don Gibson. Gibson's wide appeal was also shown in Neil Young's recorded version of "Oh Lonesome Me" on his 1970 album, After the Gold Rush, which is one of the few songs Young has recorded that he did not write.

Personal life

Don married Bobbi Patterson in 1967.  Following his death from natural causes on November 17, 2003, he was buried in the Sunset Cemetery in his hometown of Shelby, North Carolina.

Legacy
Gibson was inducted into the Nashville Songwriters Hall of Fame in 1973. In 2001 he was inducted into the Country Music Hall of Fame, and the North Carolina Music Hall of Fame in 2010.

The Don Gibson Theater

Located in Cleveland County, North Carolina, The Don Gibson Theater opened in November 2009 in historic uptown Shelby. Originally constructed in 1939, the renovated art deco gem features an exhibit of the life and accomplishments of singer-songwriter Don Gibson, an intimate 400-seat music hall, and adjoining function space that can accommodate up to 275 people. The theater showcases a busy schedule of premier musical performances. Past performers have included Marty Stuart, Pam Tillis, Tom Paxton, Ralph Stanley, Vince Gill, Ricky Skaggs, John Oates and Gene Watson.

Discography

Albums

Singles

Singles from collaboration albums

References

Other sources
Wolfe, Stacey (1998). "Don Gibson". In The Encyclopedia of Country Music. Paul Kingsbury, Editor. New York: Oxford University Press. p. 199.

External links
Don Gibson Discography
 Gibson discography at Emory Law
 Gibson in the Country Music Hall of Fame
 Gibson at the Nashville Songwriters Foundation
 Allmusic Don Gibson with Biography, Discography, Charts
 
 Website for the Don Gibson Theater

1928 births
2003 deaths
People from Shelby, North Carolina
American country singer-songwriters
Country musicians from North Carolina
Country Music Hall of Fame inductees
Grand Ole Opry members
RCA Victor artists
Hickory Records artists
20th-century American singers
Singer-songwriters from North Carolina